is a city located in Okayama Prefecture, Japan. , the city had an estimated population of 25,946 in 12287 households and a population density of 60 persons per km².

Geography 
Mimasaka is located in northeast Okayama.  Most of the city limits are hills and forests. The prefectural border is at the Chugoku Mountains, and there is Mount Ushiro (1344 meters), the highest peak in the prefecture is within the city limits. Parts of the city are considered to be  heavy snowfall areas.

Adjoining municipalities
Okayama Prefecture
Bizen
Wake
Misaki
Shōō
Nagi
Nishiawakura
Hyōgo Prefecture
Shisō
Sayō
Tottori Prefecture
Chizu

Climate
Mimasaka has a humid subtropical climate (Köppen climate classification Cfa).

Demographics
Per Japanese census data, the population of Mimasaka in 2020 is 25,939 people. Mimasaka has been conducting censuses since 1920.

History 
The area of Mimasaka is part of ancient Mimasaka Province, from which it takes its name. The Hayashino district, which is the center of the city, has long been an important transportation hub, and since the Sengoku period, goods have been transported by boats crossing the Yoshii River. In the Edo period, the Mori clan, who were the first daimyō of Tsuyama Domain, gave local merchants the same level of authority as merchants in the castle town of Tsuyama, making it the center of  eastern Mimasaka. Afterwards, it came under the direct control of the Tokugawa shogunate and a magistrate's office was established. The famed samurai Miyamoto Musashi was born in what is now part of the city.

The modern city of Mimasaka was founded on March 31, 2005 by the merger of the former town of Mimasaka, absorbing the towns of Aida, Ōhara and Sakutō, the village Higashiawakura (all from Aida District), and the town of Katsuta (from Katsuta District).

Government
Mimasaka has a mayor-council form of government with a directly elected mayor and a unicameral city council of 18 members. Mimasaka, collectively with the village of Nishiawakura, contributes one member to the Okayama Prefectural Assembly. In terms of national politics, the city is part of the Okayama 3rd district of the lower house of the Diet of Japan.

Economy
Mimasaka has a mixed economy based on manufacturing, wholesale and retail commerce, agriculture, forestry, and tourism (hot springs),

Education
Mimasaka has nine public elementary schools and five public junior high school operated by the city government, and one public high school operated by the Okayama prefectural Board of Education.

Transportation

Railway 
 JR West (JR West) - Kishin Line
  -  -  - 
 Chizu Express - Chizu Line
  -

Highways 
  Chūgoku Expressway
  Tottori Expressway

Sister and Friendship cities
Former Ōhara town
 Echizen (Former Imadate town), Fukui, Japan -  Sister city agreement concluded in 1990
 Neyagawa, Osaka, Japan - Friendship city agreement concluded in 1991
 Gleizé, France - Sister city agreement concluded on March 4, 1999
Former Sakutō town
 Saint-Valentin, France - Sister city agreement concluded on April 6, 1988
 Sankt Valentin, Austria - Sister city agreement concluded on October 25, 1994
 Saint-Valentin, Canada - Sister city agreement concluded on October 24, 1997

Local attractions
 Miyamoto Musashi Budokan
 Yunogo Onsen
 Okayama International Circuit
 Village of Miyamoto Musashi
 Ōhara-shuku (Shukuba)
 Valentine Park Sakutō
 Chōfukuji Temple
 Japan museum of contemporary toy & Hall of music box

Notable people from Mimasaka
 Miyamoto Musashi, noted samurai in the Edo Period
 Tomoji Abe, author
 Doshin So, founder of Shorinji Kempo
 Atsuko Asano, author

References

External links

 Mimasaka City official website 
  美作国, Dojo Miyamoto Musashi Gleizé 

Cities in Okayama Prefecture
Mimasaka, Okayama